Uncial 0135 (in the Gregory-Aland numbering), ε 85 (Soden), is a Greek uncial manuscript of the New Testament, dated paleographically to the 9th century.

Description 
The codex contains a fragments of the Matthew, Mark, and Luke, on 16 parchment leaves (14.3 cm by 12.5 cm). It is written in two columns per page, 20 lines per page, in uncial letters. It has breathings and accents.

There is also another division according to the smaller Ammonian Sections, but without references to the Eusebian Canons. It contains lectionary markings at the margin.

Currently it is dated by the INTF to the 9th century.

It is a palimpsest, the upper text was overwritten in 1415, it contains Erotemata grammaticalia written by Manuel Moschopoulos.

 Contents
 Gospel of Matthew 25:35-26:2; 27:3-17; 
 Mark 1:12-24; 2:26-3:10; 
 Luke 1:24-37; 1:68-2:4; 4:28-40; 6:22-35; 8:22-30; 9:42-53; 17:2-14; 18:7-9.13-19; 22:11-25.52-66; 23:35-49(?); 24:32-46,

 Text
The Greek text of this codex is a representative of the Byzantine text-type. Kurt Aland placed it in Category V.

 Location
The codex is located now at the Biblioteca Ambrosiana (Q. 6 sup., fol. 15. 18. 31. 34. 47. 50. 62. 65) in Milan.

 History
There is inscription on folio 4 verso "Ex dono Io. Baptistae Portae Neapoli V. Clarissimi". Gregory saw the manuscript in 1886.

See also 

 List of New Testament uncials
 Textual criticism

References

Further reading 

 Hermann von Soden, "Die Schriften des Neuen Testaments, in ihrer ältesten erreichbaren Textgestalt hergestellt auf Grund ihrer Textgeschichte," Verlag von Arthur Glaue, Berlin 1902, p. 82. 
 J. H. Greenlee, Nine uncial Palimpsests of the New Testament, S & D XXXIX (Salt Like City, 1968).

External links 
 U. Haepli, Catalogus graecorum Bibliothecace Ambrosianae (Mediolani 1906), vol. II, pp. 742–743.

Greek New Testament uncials
9th-century biblical manuscripts
Palimpsests
Manuscripts of the Ambrosiana collections